Inner Zone Journey is a 2010 album released by X Marks the Pedwalk.

Reception

SideLine News called Inner Zone Journey "a cool album" and called "Seventeen" "the absolute masterpiece."

Track listing
 "Lifeline" - 5:20
 "Runaway" - 4:37
 "Obscure Reason" - 5:13
 "Satellite" - 4:01
 "Seventeen" - 4:58
 "Winter Comes Tomorrow" - 4:43
 "Human Scientists" - 4:47
 "Clean Hearts" - 6:06
 "Stripped By Tears" - 4:41
 "Snapshots In A Dark Room" - 6:49
 "Distant Rain" - 3:10

References

2010 albums
X Marks the Pedwalk albums